{{Infobox television
| image                = Say Yes to the Dress Bridesmaids.jpg
| image_size           = 250
| genre                = Reality
| country              = United States
| language             = English
| num_seasons          = 4
| num_episodes         = 52
| runtime              = 20 to 22 minutes
| company              = North South Productions
| channel              = TLC
| first_aired          = 
| last_aired           = 
| related              = Say Yes to the DressSay Yes to the Dress: Atlanta
}}Say Yes to the Dress: Bridesmaids is an American reality television series on TLC which follows events at Bridals by Lori in the Atlanta suburb of Sandy Springs, a bridal shop owned by Lori Allen. The series shows the progress of individual sales associates, managers, and fitters at the store, focusing on bridesmaid dresses and the bridesmaid showroom at Bridals by Lori. It is a spin-off of Say Yes to the Dress. Soon after the end of its first season, TLC renewed the show for a second season.

Development
The idea for the spin-off occurred while in the set of Say Yes to the Dress: Atlanta. While the producers were in the bridal boutique where the show takes place they overheard a commotion between women in another part of the store over which bridesmaid dresses to select. This gave the producers the inspiration for a separate show based in the same boutique, focusing on bridesmaid dresses and the conflicts between the bride, her bridesmaids, and her family over what designs to purchase. Allen discussed with Good Morning America'' that the conflict often occurs because of a lack of communication between the bridesmaids and the bride over budget, body-type issues, and the bride's vision for their visual role in the wedding, which Allen states should have been discussed before entering the store, not afterwards.

Episodes

Season 1 (2011)

Season 2 (2012)

Season 3 (2012)

Season 4 (2013)

References

General references 
 
 
 
 

2010s American reality television series
2011 American television series debuts
2013 American television series endings
English-language television shows
TLC (TV network) original programming
American television spin-offs
Reality television spin-offs